Municipal governments in Saint Pierre and Miquelon are responsible for day-to-day function on the islands and are in effect city council or a level of local government under the General Council.

There are two levels of local government in the territory, Miquelon-Langlade and Saint Pierre.

The municipal council is made up of the mayor, councillors (conseillers) and associates (adjoints).

Saint-Pierre
The local government of Saint-Pierre consist of the mayor (maire) and councillors (conseillers). The council sits at a three-storey structure on rue de Paris. The current senior council consists of:
 Maire de Saint-Pierre - Madame Karine CLAIREAUX
 Adjoints - Madame Josée QUEDINET-DETCHEVERRY
 Adjoints - Monsieur Frédéric BEAUMONT
 Adjoints - Monsieur Claude ARROSSAMENA
 Adjoints - Monsieur Rémi GIRARDIN
 Adjoints - Madame Josée BEAUPERTUIS GOUPILLIERE
 Adjoints - Monsieur Patrick LEBAILLY
 Adjoints - Madame Rachel POUETH ANDRIEUX
 Adjoints - Monsieur Yvon SALOMON

Unlike the council on Miquelon-Langlade, the general council members are divided into the governing council and opposition members.

The current general council consists of:

Les Conseillers de la majorité
 Monsieur Norbert HACALA
 Madame Thérèse POIRIER
 Madame Claudette FRANCHE-RUAULT
 Monsieur Jean-François OZON
 Madame Maryse GORGET-TESNIERE
 Madame Lydia DESDOUETS-LE SOAVEC
 Monsieur Bruno ARTHUR
 Madame Véronique GIRARDIN
 Monsieur Jérôme DETCHEVERRY
 Madame Marie-Luce BRIAND
 Monsieur Jean-Marie QUEDINET
 Monsieur Michel JACCACHURY
 Madame Marie-Claire RIO
 Madame Martine RIOU-MICHEL

Les Conseillers de l'opposition
 Madame Jacqueline POIRIER
 Madame Dominica MICHEL-REVERT
 Monsieur Loïc FOUCHARD
 Madame Tatiana URTIZBEREA
 Monsieur Thierry LETOURNEL
 Monsieur Pascal DEROUET

Miquelon-Langlade 
The local government of Mairie de Miquelon-Langlade is led by the maire or mayor and conseillers or councillors. The council sits at a two-storey structure on rue Baron de l'Espérance.

The current council consists of:
 Le Maire de Miquelon-Langlade Denis Detcheverry
 Adjoints - Stéphane COSTE
 Adjoints - Gérald BOISSEL
 Adjoints - Gino BONNIEUL
 Adjoints - Chantal MICHEL
 Conseillers - Carole EPAULE
 Conseillers - Carine DETCHEVERRY
 Conseillers - Flore ORSINY
 Conseillers - Dominique AUTIN
 Conseillers - Roger ETCHEBERRY
 Conseillers - Marianne GUEGUEN
 Conseillers - Yann BOUTEILLER
 Conseillers - Paul-André LUCAS
 Conseillers - Martial DETCHEVERRY
 Conseillers - Cyrille DETCHEVERRY

References
 Mairie de Miquelon-Langlade
 Mairie de Saint-Pierre

Municipal government of Saint Pierre and Miquelon
Politics of Saint Pierre and Miquelon
Government of Saint Pierre and Miquelon